The Roman Catholic  Diocese of Ciudad Guzmán (erected 25 March 1972) is a suffragan diocese of the Archdiocese of Guadalajara, in Jalisco, Mexico. The diocesan seat is the Cathedral of San José, Ciudad Guzmán.

Ordinaries
Leonardo Viera Contreras (1972-1977) 
Serafín Vásquez Elizalde (1977-1999)
Braulio Rafael León Villegas (1999-2017)
Óscar Armando Campos Contreras (25 Sep 2017 Appointed - )

Episcopal see
Ciudad Guzmán, Jalisco

External links and references

Ciudad Guzman
Ciudad Guzman, Roman Catholic Diocese of
Ciudad Guzman
Ciudad Guzman